Saddle Mountain may refer to:

Alberta, Canada
Saddle Mountain (Alberta), in Banff National Park

Arizona
Saddle Mountain (Arizona), the Saddle Mountain Wilderness 
Saddle Mountain (Grand Canyon), a prominent mountain ridge and protected wilderness area of the same name in the Kaibab National Forest

Colorado
Saddle Mountain Natural Area, a protected area in Park County, Colorado, USA
Saddle Mountain (Delta County, Colorado) near Crawford, Colorado

Idaho
Saddle Mountain (Idaho), in Butte County, Idaho

Montana
Saddle Mountain (Beaverhead County, Montana) in Beaverhead County, Montana
Saddle Mountain (Deer Lodge County, Montana) in Deer Lodge County, Montana
Saddle Mountain (Lincoln County, Montana) in Lincoln County, Montana
Saddle Mountain (Powell County, Montana) in Powell County, Montana
Saddle Mountain (Ravalli County, Montana) in Ravalli County, Montana

Oklahoma
Saddle Mountain, Oklahoma in Kiowa County, Oklahoma, Oklahoma

Oregon
Saddle Mountain State Natural Area, in the Coast Range of Oregon
Saddle Mountain (Clatsop County, Oregon), in northwest Oregon
Saddle Mountain (Klamath County, Oregon) in Klamath County, Oregon
South Saddle Mountain, in Washington County, Oregon

Washington (state)
Saddle Mountain National Wildlife Refuge, in the Hanford Reach National Monument
Saddle Mountains, a ridge in Grant County, central Washington state; distinguished from Saddle Mountain in Mason County, western Washington.

West Virginia
Saddle Mountain (Mineral County, West Virginia), along US 50 in West Virginia

Wyoming
Saddle Mountain (Wyoming), a peak in Yellowstone National Park

Translations
 Saddle Mountain, a translation of Cerro de la Silla
 Saddle Mountain, a translation of Mount Sedlovaya, a former name of Mount Seorak in South Korea

See also
Saddle Peak (disambiguation)